Bani Saif as-Safl is a sub-district located in Al Qafr District, Ibb Governorate, Yemen. Bani Saif as-Safl had a population of 17679 according to the 2004 census.

References 

Sub-districts in Al Qafr District